You Are So Good to Me is a song co-written by Waterdeep's founding vocalist, guitarist and songwriter Don Chaffer; musician, author, and head of the Blue Renaissance Creative Group, Ben Pasley; and musician, author, and interior designer Robin Pasley. It has been recorded by Christian rock bands Waterdeep, Third Day, and many others. Released as a single from Third Day's 2003 album Offerings II: All I Have to Give, it was the inaugural No. single on the Billboard Hot Christian Songs chart.

Charts
Weekly

Decade-end

References

2003 singles
2003 songs
Essential Records (Christian) singles